The qualifying rounds for the 2002–03 UEFA Champions League began on 17 July 2002. In total, there were three qualifying rounds which provided 16 clubs to join the group stage.

Teams

First qualifying round
The draw for this round was performed on 21 June 2002 in Geneva, Switzerland.

Seeding
Teams with a coefficient of at least 1.498 were seeded.

Summary

Matches

Vardar won 4–1 on aggregate.

Hibernians won 3–2 on aggregate.

Belshina won 3–2 on aggregate.

Željezničar won 4–0 on aggregate.

Skonto won 6–0 on aggregate.

APOEL won 1–0 on aggregate.

4–4 on aggregate; Sheriff won on away goals.

Pyunik won 6–0 on aggregate.

Dinamo Tirana won 3–2 on aggregate.

Torpedo Kutaisi won 6–2 on aggregate.

Second qualifying round
The draw for this round was performed on 21 June 2002 in Geneva, Switzerland.

Seeding
Teams with a coefficient of at least 10.916 were seeded.

Notes

Summary

Matches

Grazer AK won 6–1 on aggregate.

Maccabi Haifa won 5–0 on aggregate.

Dynamo Kyiv won 6–2 on aggregate.

2–2 on aggregate; Zalaegerszeg won on away goals.

Boavista won 7–3 on aggregate.

Sparta Prague won 5–1 on aggregate.

Levski Sofia won 2–0 on aggregate.

Legia Warsaw won 4–2 on aggregate.

Partizan won 5–1 on aggregate.

Basel won 4–1 on aggregate.

APOEL won 5–4 on aggregate.

Željezničar won 2–0 on aggregate.

Club Brugge won 4–1 on aggregate.

Brøndby won 5–0 on aggregate.

Third qualifying round
The draw for this round was performed on 26 July 2002 in Nyon, Switzerland.

Seeding
Teams with a coefficient of at least 36.062 were seeded.

Notes

Matches

Matches

4–4 on aggregate; Genk won on away goals.

Feyenoord won 3–0 on aggregate.

Maccabi Haifa won 5–3 on aggregate.

Auxerre won 1–0 on aggregate.

AEK Athens won 4–2 on aggregate.

Manchester United won 5–1 on aggregate.

Internazionale won 2–0 on aggregate.

Bayern Munich won 6–1 on aggregate.

2–2 on aggregate; Club Brugge won on penalties.

Newcastle United won 5–0 on aggregate.

3–3 on aggregate; Basel won on away goals.

Lokomotiv Moscow won 5–3 on aggregate.

Rosenborg won 4–2 on aggregate.

Dynamo Kyiv won 2–0 on aggregate.

2–2 on aggregate; Milan won on away goals.

Barcelona won 4–0 on aggregate.

Notes

References

External links
 2002–03 season at UEFA website
 European Cup results at Rec.Sport.Soccer Statistics Foundation
 

Qualifying Rounds
2002-03